Jakob Jutz (1915 – 26 August 1951) was a Swiss long-distance runner. He competed in the marathon at the 1948 Summer Olympics.

References

1915 births
1951 deaths
Athletes (track and field) at the 1948 Summer Olympics
Swiss male long-distance runners
Swiss male marathon runners
Olympic athletes of Switzerland
Place of birth missing